Manville S. Hodgson was a member of the Wisconsin State Assembly.

Biography
Hodgson was born on May 3, 1843. He attended Carroll College. During the American Civil War, Hodgson served with the 17th Michigan Volunteer Infantry Regiment of the Union Army. Engagements he took part in include the Siege of Vicksburg. On January 25, 1879, he married Jessie North.

His father, John Hodgson, was a member of the Wisconsin State Senate.

Assembly career
Hodgson was a member of the Assembly from 1874 to 1875. He was a Republican.

References

People from Waukesha County, Wisconsin
Republican Party members of the Wisconsin State Assembly
People of Wisconsin in the American Civil War
Union Army soldiers
Carroll University alumni
1843 births
Year of death missing